The 1930 Colorado Silver and Gold football team was an American football team that represented the University of Colorado as a member of the Rocky Mountain Conference (RMC) during the 1930 college football season. Led by 11th-year head coach Myron E. Witham, Colorado compiled an overall record of 6–1–1 with a mark of 5–1–1 in conference play, placing second in the RMC.

Schedule

References

Colorado
Colorado Buffaloes football seasons
Colorado Silver and Gold football